Lam Narai railway station is a railway station located in Lam Narai Subdistrict, Chai Badan District, Lopburi.

Train services 
 Express No. 69/70 Bangkok–Nong Khai–Bangkok
 Express No. 75/76 Bangkok–Nong Khai–Bangkok
 Rapid No. 133/134 Bangkok–Nong Khai–Bangkok
 Local No. 433/434 Kaeng Khoi Junction–Bua Yai Junction–Kaeng Khoi Junction
 Local No. 437/438 Kaeng Khoi Junction–Lam Narai–Kaeng Khoi Junction
 Local No. 439/440 Kaeng Khoi Junction–Bua Yai Junction–Kaeng Khoi Junction

References 
 
 

Railway stations in Thailand